The men's javelin throw event at the 2007 Asian Athletics Championships was held in Amman, Jordan on July 29.

Results

References
Final results

2007 Asian Athletics Championships
Javelin throw at the Asian Athletics Championships